Libman is a surname. Notable people with the surname include:

Andrea Libman (born 1984), Canadian actress and voice actor
Emanuel Libman (1872–1946), American physician
Leslie Libman, American television director
Robert Libman (born 1960), former politician in Quebec, Canada
Salomón Libman (born 1984), Peruvian goalkeeper
Morris Libman (born 1953), American fundraiser for ACSZ
Hannah Libman (born 1929), Award-winning collage artist

Other
LibMan（Microsoft Library Manager）

See also
The Libman Company
Libman v. Quebec (Attorney General), a Supreme Court of Canada ruling issued on October 9, 1997
Libman-Sacks endocarditis, a form of nonbacterial endocarditis seen in systemic lupus erythematosus

References